Kenny Parker (born July 22, 1946) is a former American football defensive back who played in the National Football League.

Early life and high school
Parker was born and grew up in Paterson, New Jersey and attended Eastside High School. He played basketball and football and was named first-team All-Passaic Valley Conference at quarterback as a senior.

College basketball career
Parker played basketball at Fordham, which did not have a college football team at the time. Parker played under head coach Johnny Bach and was a starter at guard. He named the Rams captain as a senior and was an Academic All-America selection. Parker averaged 4.9 points over 77 games during his collegiate basketball career.

Professional career
Despite not having played football since high school, Parker was selected in the 16th round of the 1968 NFL/AFL Draft by the New York Giants. He suffered a season-ending injury during the 1968 preseason and spent 1969 on the practice squad. Parker made the Giants active roster in 1970, and eventually became a starter at cornerback due to injuries. Parker was cut at the end of training camp in 1971.

References

1946 births
American football defensive backs
Fordham Rams men's basketball players
Players of American football from Paterson, New Jersey
New York Giants players
Eastside High School (Paterson, New Jersey) alumni
Basketball players from Paterson, New Jersey
Living people